The 2017 Honda Indy Grand Prix of Alabama was the third round of the 2017 IndyCar Series season. The race was held on April 23, 2017 at Barber Motorsports Park in Birmingham, Alabama. Australian Will Power qualified on pole for the event, while American Josef Newgarden took victory.

Report

Qualifying
Qualifying was held on Saturday, April 22. Team Penske dominated the session, taking the top three spots with Will Power starting from pole position with a time of 1:06.9614 at an average speed of 127.95 mph (205.92 km/h). Behind him were his teammates Hélio Castroneves and Simon Pagenaud. Scott Dixon, Ryan Hunter-Reay, and James Hinchcliffe rounded out the top six.

Race
The race was held on Sunday, April 23 with a threat of rain through the duration of the event. Prior to the green flag, Marco Andretti suffered issues starting the car, resulting in him falling three laps behind before even turning a lap. At the start of the race, Will Power and Hélio Castroneves maintained their positions, while Scott Dixon was able to pass Simon Pagenaud for third place. Behind them, Ryan Hunter-Reay and James Hinchcliffe made contact coming out of turn three, casing a piece of Hunter-Reay's front wing to break off and hit the front wing of Ed Jones, breaking his front wing as well. During the incident, Josef Newgarden was able to slip by both to move up to fifth place. The debris from the incident resulted in the first caution period of the race. During this period, Hunter-Reay and Jones both pitted for repairs. 

Racing resumed on lap 6, with the running order up front remaining unchanged. However, Newgarden began to gain ground and, only a few laps after the restart, was able to pass Pagenaud for fourth. Hinchcliffe managed to move into fifth in the same move after Pagenaud lost momentum from being forced out wide by Newgarden. The first round of green flag pit stops followed, during which Newgarden was able to jump up to second thanks to quick pit work from his team and the slowing pace of Castroneves and Dixon, who had gone the farthest on their first stint. Dixon was also able to get around Castroneves during the sequence, allowing him to maintain his third position. Further back in the field, Alexander Rossi, despite a poor qualifying result, had managed to move into the top ten and was continuing to improve. 

The second round of green flag pit stops came just after lap 40. Just before their stops, Dixon was able to get around Newgarden for second place. However, a slow pit stop from his team meant that Dixon emerged behind Newgarden once again following the pit sequence. Behind them, Castroneves fell back even further, as both Pagenaud and Hinchcliffe were able to make faster pit stops than the Brazilian veteran. After the stops, Newgarden began to close in on Power, reducing the gap to roughly 1 second before Power responded a pulled the gap back out to nearly 2 seconds by lap 60. 

On lap 62, just before the opening for the final round of stops, the second caution of the race came when Spencer Pigot, who had been running eighth, spun coming out of turn 5 and stalled just off course. Nearly the entire field pitted during the caution, with Power emerging from pit lane first, while Dixon managed to leapfrog Newgarden. However, the race lead belonged now to Charlie Kimball, who elected to stay out during the caution. With Kimball's final pit stop still coming, however, Power was essentially still the leader of the race.

Racing resumed with 22 laps to go. Kimball and Power maintained their positions, but Newgarden was able to get back around Dixon in less than one lap. On lap 75, Kimball pitted, handing the lead back to Power. However, Power's car had developed a puncture in one of the rear tires, forcing Power to pit and dropping him well down the running order. Newgarden inherited the lead and, despite pressure from Dixon behind, took his fourth career victory. Pagenaud came across the line third, Castroneves fourth, and Rossi a respectable fifth. Power was only able to recover to 14th; a disappointing end to a day he dominated.

For Newgarden, the victory was his first driving for Team Penske and his first since Iowa of the previous season. It was also his second win at Barber in three years. For Dixon, it was his seventh podium finish at the track without a victory. Sébastien Bourdais managed an eighth place finish on the day, allowing him to maintain his points lead. 

For the third consecutive year, no cars retired from the event.

Results

Qualifying

Source for individual rounds:

Race

Notes:
 Points include 1 point for leading at least 1 lap during a race, an additional 2 points for leading the most race laps, and 1 point for Pole Position.

Source for time gaps:

Championship standings after the race

Drivers' Championship standings

Manufacturer standings

 Note: Only the top five positions are included.

References

External links
Official Pit Stop Data 

Official Race Broadcast

Honda Indy Grand Prix of Alabama
Grand Prix of Alabama
Honda Indy Grand Prix of Alabama
Honda Indy Grand Prix